Greenwood is a city in Clark County in the U.S. state of Wisconsin. The population was 1,026 at the 2010 census.

Geography
Greenwood is located at  (44.767826, -90.598959).

The town has a peace memorial, created by Ernest Durig from an artificial stone made using concrete and fine white sand. Unveiled in 1937, it was restored in 1982, and sits adjacent to the 1934 City Hall, on the corner of Main Street and Division Street.

Demographics

2010 census
As of the census of 2010, there were 1,026 people, 464 households, and 259 families living in the city. The racial makeup of the city was 97.5% White, 0.9% African American, 0.4% Native American, 0.1% Asian, 0.7% from other races, and 0.5% from two or more races. Hispanic or Latino of any race were 1.5% of the population.

There were 464 households, of which 24.4% had children under the age of 18 living with them, 43.8% were married couples living together, 7.5% had a female householder with no husband present, 4.5% had a male householder with no wife present, and 44.2% were non-families. 36.6% of all households were made up of individuals, and 16.2% had someone living alone who was 65 years of age or older. The average household size was 2.18 and the average family size was 2.87.

The median age in the city was 44.1 years. 22.5% of residents were under the age of 18; 7.6% were between the ages of 18 and 24; 21.2% were from 25 to 44; 27.1% were from 45 to 64; and 21.7% were 65 years of age or older. The gender makeup of the city was 48.1% male and 51.9% female.

2000 census
As of the census of 2000, there were 1,079 people, 468 households, and 287 families living in the city. The population density was 381.9 people per square mile (147.2/km2). There were 502 housing units at an average density of 177.7 per square mile (68.5/km2). The racial makeup of the city was 99.17% White, 0.19% Native American, 0.09% Asian, 0.09% from other races, and 0.46% from two or more races. Hispanic or Latino of any race were 1.11% of the population.

There were 468 households, out of which 27.8% had children under the age of 18 living with them, 50.9% were married couples living together, 6.4% had a female householder with no husband present, and 38.5% were non-families. 34.2% of all households were made up of individuals, and 19.2% had someone living alone who was 65 years of age or older. The average household size was 2.27 and the average family size was 2.93.

In the city, the population was spread out, with 23.6% under the age of 18, 7.5% from 18 to 24, 28.5% from 25 to 44, 18.6% from 45 to 64, and 21.8% who were 65 years of age or older. The median age was 38 years. For every 100 females, there were 93.7 males. For every 100 females age 18 and over, there were 93.9 males.

The median income for a household in the city was $32,917, and the median income for a family was $43,438. Males had a median income of $33,750 versus $22,132 for females. The per capita income for the city was $18,841. About 5.7% of families and 9.3% of the population were below the poverty line, including 13.1% of those under age 18 and 11.1% of those age 65 or over.

Notable people

 Mildred Barber Abel, Wisconsin State Representative
 Joseph L. Barber, Wisconsin State Senator
 Cy Buker, Major League Baseball pitcher for the Brooklyn Dodgers
 Harland Carl, National Football League player with the Chicago Bears
 Mose Gingerich, host of reality TV series about Amish people   
 William C. Kavanaugh, Wisconsin State Representative
 Larry Krause, National Football League player with the Green Bay Packers 
 Bill Miklich, National Football League player with the New York Giants and Detroit Lions
 Mae Schunk, Lieutenant Governor of Minnesota

Images

References

External links

 City of Greenwood
 Sanborn fire insurance maps: 1894 1902 1922

Cities in Wisconsin
Cities in Clark County, Wisconsin